Titanic is a 1994 album by the Russian band Nautilus Pompilius. The video clip of the title track "Titanic" was one of the most popular on Russian television that year.

Track listing

References

1994 albums